James Edward Barry (September 18, 1884 – December 23, 1941) was an American football and baseball coach. He was the head coach of the College of William & Mary's baseball and football teams for their respective 1907 seasons. 

A native of Norfolk, Virginia, Barry attended the University of Virginia, where he played football in 1905 as an end and baseball as a left fielder. He began coaching the football team at William & Mary in 1906 and assisted George E. O'Hearn with coaching the 1908 William & Mary Orange and White football team.

Head coaching record

Football

References

1884 births
1941 deaths
American football ends
Baseball outfielders
Virginia Cavaliers baseball players
Virginia Cavaliers football players
William & Mary Tribe baseball coaches
William & Mary Tribe football coaches
Sportspeople from Norfolk, Virginia
Coaches of American football from Virginia
Players of American football from Norfolk, Virginia
Baseball coaches from Virginia
Baseball players from Norfolk, Virginia